Tsogo Secondary School is a school founded on ethos of Roman Catholic Church. It is an English medium High School located on the Most Holy Redeemer Catholic Church campus in Mmakau North West of the City of Tshwane, in the North West Province of South Africa. When the school was founded the Sisters of Mercy were at the helm of its administration.

History
Tsogo Secondary School (formerly Tsogo High School) was established at the request of the Stigmatine Fathers by the Sister of Mercy in January 1975. ‘Tsogo’ is a Setswana name meaning ‘Resurrection' - thus, since the school was founded on Catholic ethos, the name translates to the 'Resurrection of Christ'.

Beginning
The story of Tsogo Secondary School begins with the Catholic (Sisters of Mercy) . The Sisters of Mercy are a Catholic Women Religious Congregation founded in Dublin, Ireland which dates back to the 1970s and has amongst other things worked to establish community centres, schools, adult education centres and various centres across the country and globe. The Congregation has worked for over 30 years to assist and uplift communities through Christianity and philosophies of collectivism and self-help.

Tsogo Today
The school's campus also houses a primary school, Morekolodi Primary School and a preschool, Motsweding. In addition, the campus houses a community centre, an adult education centre, a church, a health centre, a refugee centre and a convent. The school is housed in a campus that gives learners an opportunity to interact with the community in some activities and therefore gain from social interaction and community work. The school has a small library, computer room, science and biology laboratories, technology room and a newly built mathematics lab.

The school has produced many successful alumni who have gone on to achieve success in their academic undertakings and careers. The majority of learners from the school come from the villages of Mmakau, Bethanie, Hebron and nearby townships of (Garankuwa|Ga-Rankuwa), (Mothotlung),(Mabopane), (Rankotea) and (Soshanguve). The community centre, called Mmashiko offers adult education. The community centre, which is adjacent to the school offers classes such as computer literacy, sewing and dressmaking, and bricklaying.

Subjects
Setswana
English
Afrikaans
Biology 
Physical Science
Business Economics
Mathematics
Maths Literacy
Additional Mathematics
Accounting
History
Life Orientation Skills

Honours
Tsogo is a Dinaledi school

Notable alumni

Arts and media
 Tim Modise

Business
Patrice Motsepe
Kgoadi Malatse
 Dan Marokane
 Thabo Ncalo, Mandela Washington Fellow, Harvard University Fellow, TEDx speaker, Head of Investment Strategy for Old Mutual Limited

Medicine
 Dr. Gomolemo Mokae, author, medical doctor and political commentator

Sciences and engineering
 Ramatsemela Mphahlele
 Dr. Vukosi Marivate, PhD (Rutgers, N.J), Harvard University Fellow

Notes

External links
Catholic Schools Office, Archdiocese of Pretoria and Diocese of Johannesburg
Wits University Top Feeder Schools
Tsogo High School Alumni Directory
Tsogo High School Alumni Society Information
The Story of the Sisters of Mercy, South Africa (Page 13)

Catholic secondary schools in South Africa
High schools in South Africa
Schools in North West (South African province)